In legal Latin, juris privati means "of private right; not clothed with a public interest."  Contrast juris publici.

References

Munn v Illinois, 94 US 113
The History of the Common Law of England By Matthew Hale,  Charles Runnington

Latin legal terminology